This is a list of all (former) Member of the European Parliament for the Christian Union – Reformed Political Party (CU-SGP)
Source:

Seats in the European Parliament
Results for Christian Union-SGP common list. Participated as SGP/RPF/GPV, before 2004

SGP 
Reformed Political Party (SGP)

GPV 
Reformed Political Alliance (GPV)

Alphabetical

Elected members of the European Parliament (from 1979)
Current members of the European Parliament are in bold.

SGP

CU
GPV or RPF before 2004.

European Parliament periods

1979-1984 

SGP 0 Seats:
GPV 0 Seats:

1984-1989 

1 Seats:
 Leen van der Waal (SGP)

1989-1994 

1 Seat:
 Leen van der Waal (SGP)

1994-1999 

2 Seats:
 Hans Blokland (GPV) 
 Leen van der Waal (SGP), till 2 September 1997 
 Rijk van Dam (RPF), from September 1997

1999-2004 

3 Seats:
 Bas Belder (SGP) 
 Hans Blokland (GPV) 
 Rijk van Dam (RPF)

2004-2009 

2 Seat:
 Hans Blokland (CU) 
 Bas Belder (SGP)

2009-2014 

2 Seats:
 Peter van Dalen (CU) 
 Bas Belder (SGP)

2014-2019 

2 Seats:
 Peter van Dalen (CU) (top candidate) 
 Bas Belder (SGP)

2019-2024 

2 Seats:
 Peter van Dalen (CU) (top candidate) 
 Bert-Jan Ruissen (SGP)

References

Christian Union (Netherlands) MEPs
Reformed Political Party MEPs